Daniel Eugene Hurley  (born 21 April 1940) is an Australian clergyman who was the sixth bishop of the Catholic Diocese of Darwin, having served in this position from 29 August 2007 until he retired on 27 June 2018.

Before that, he served as Bishop of Port Pirie from 1998 until 2007, after having been a parish priest in Port Pirie since he was ordained in 1964.

In the 2019 Australia Day Honours Hurley was made a Member of the Order of Australia (AM) for "significant service to the Catholic Church in Australia, and to the community of the Northern Territory".

References

External links

1940 births
Living people
People from Orroroo, South Australia
21st-century Roman Catholic bishops in Australia
Roman Catholic bishops of Darwin
Members of the Order of Australia
Roman Catholic bishops of Port Pirie